Priya Ranjan Dasmunsi (Prio Rônjon Dashmunshi; 13 November 1945 – 20 November 2017) was an Indian National Congress politician, former Union Minister and a member of the 14th Lok Sabha of India. He represented the Raiganj (Lok Sabha constituency) of West Bengal. He died on 20 November 2017, aged 72, after nine years in a coma following a massive stroke.

Career
Dasmunsi was president of Indian Youth Congress in West Bengal from 1970 to 1971. He was elected to the 5th Lok Sabha from the South Calcutta constituency in the 1971 Indian general election. He was appointed as the Union Minister of State for Commerce in 1985 by prime minister Rajiv Gandhi. Within West Bengal, he was known for his strong anti-Left credentials.

In 2004, in the First Manmohan Singh ministry, he was appointed as the Minister of Parliamentary Affairs and the Ministry of Information and Broadcasting. He controversially banned television networks he deemed "obscene", including a three-month ban on the Sony-owned television network AXN and Fashion TV.  

In 2007, Dasmunsi was also responsible requiring broadcaster Nimbus Communications to share broadcast rights for the Indian cricket team with the state television network, Doordarshan — this despite Nimbus paying hundreds of millions of dollars for the rights to the Board of Control for Cricket in India.

Dasmunsi served as the president of the All India Football Federation for almost twenty years, from 1988 to 2008. He was succeeded by Nationalist Congress Party politician Praful Patel.

Electoral record
 In 1971, Dasmunsi won in the general elections from the Constituency (Lok Sabha) South Calcutta.
 In 1984, he won in the general elections from the Howrah (Lok Sabha constituency).
 In 1989, he lost in the general elections from Howrah.
 In 1991, he lost in the general elections from Howrah.
 In 1996, he won in the general elections from Howrah.
 In 1999, he won in the general elections from Raiganj (Lok Sabha constituency)
 In 2004, he won in the general elections from Raiganj (Lok Sabha constituency).

All India Football Federation
Dasmunsi succeeded Khalifa Ziauddin as the president of the All India Football Federation (AIFF) in December 1988. Under his leadership, the AIFF launched the National Football League in 1996. The National Football League would be replaced by the I-League for the 2007-08 season. The India national football team won the 2008 AFC Challenge Cup in Delhi to qualify for the 2011 AFC Asian Cup in Doha.

He was a member of the FIFA Technical Study Group Member in 1995 FIFA Women's World Cup held in Sweden and a Match Commissioner in 1999 FIFA Women's World Cup held in the United States. He was also the first Indian official to be appointed as a special Duty officer, at the 1998 FIFA World Cup and the 2002 FIFA World Cup. He was also the Chef`de Mission of the India Olympics Contingent at the 2004 Summer Olympics, and Match Commissioner for two World Cup Matches at the 2006 FIFA World Cup in Germany.

Life
Dasmunsi was married in 1994 to Mrs. Deepa Dasmunsi, a social worker from Kolkata. They have a young son, Priyadeep Dasmunshi.

Dasmunsi suffered from numerous problems like diabetes and hypertension during his prime. He suffered a massive stroke and paralysis on 12 October 2008, leaving him in minimum conscious state. He was admitted to the All India Institute of Medical Sciences (AIIMS) in New Delhi and was later shifted to Apollo Hospital in New Delhi. He remained on life support, and was diagnosed with a complete failure of the left ventricular system. In November 2009, Dasmunsi was temporarily moved to Düsseldorf, where he underwent stem cell therapy in an attempt to reverse some of the loss of brain functions caused by the stroke.

Since Dasmunsi's hospitalization, his wife Deepa has to some extent taken over his political mantle; she was elected from Raiganj (Lok Sabha constituency) in 2009.

On 10 October 2011, the Indraprastha Apollo Hospital in Delhi advised his family to take him home and care for him there.

After lingering for nine years in coma, Dasmunsi finally died on 20 November 2017, a week after his 72nd birthday. His dead body was taken to his ancestral home in Raiganj, West Bengal, and was cremated at the local crematorium.

References

External links
 Dasmunsi called Nimbus Communications 'unpatriotic' for refusing to share a live feed of Indian cricket matches with state broadcast Doordarshan.
 

|-

|-

|-

|-

|-

1945 births
2017 deaths
Indian National Congress politicians
People from West Bengal
India MPs 2004–2009
Members of the Cabinet of India
Indian Youth Congress Presidents
West Bengal politicians
University of Calcutta alumni
Ministers for Information and Broadcasting of India
India MPs 1999–2004
India MPs 1996–1997
India MPs 1984–1989
India MPs 1971–1977
Lok Sabha members from West Bengal
People from Uttar Dinajpur district
Indian Congress (Socialist) politicians
People from Howrah district
People from Kolkata district
Indian National Congress (U) politicians
Indian sports executives and administrators
Indian football executives
Presidents of the All India Football Federation